KAEH (100.9 FM) is a commercial radio station licensed in Beaumont, California,  with studios located on South E Street in San Bernardino, California, broadcasting to the south-eastern sections of the Riverside-San Bernardino, California, area. KAEH airs a regional Mexican music format branded as "Radio Lazer."

References

External links
 Radio Lazer 101.7 y 100.9 Facebook
 

AEH
Regional Mexican radio stations in the United States
AEH
Mass media in Riverside County, California
Mass media in San Bernardino County, California
Beaumont, California
Radio stations established in 1996
1996 establishments in California